Frants may refer to:

Frants Banner (died 1575), Danish landowner and lensmann
Frants Berg (1504–1591), Danish clergyman, Bishop of Oslo
Frants Beyer (1851–1918), Norwegian average adjuster, tax inspector and composer
Frants Diderik Bøe, (1820–1891), Norwegian painter,
Anna Frants (born 1965), American multimedia artist, curator, and art collector
Karl-August Frants (1895–1942), Estonian politician
Frants Frisenfeldt (1889–1976), Danish wrestler
Frants Gufler (born 1957), Danish curler and curling coach
Frants Johannes Hansen (1810–1852), Danish author and amateur musician
Frants Henningsen (1850–1908), Danish painter, illustrator and professor
Frants Philip Hopstock (1746–1824), Norwegian priest
Frants Hvass (1896–1982), Danish diplomat
Frants Kostyukevich (born 1963), race walker, represented the USSR and later Belarus
Yuriy-Frants Kulchytsky (1640–1694), Polish nobleman, diplomat, and spy during the Great Turkish War
Frants Levinson-Lessing (1861–1939), Russian geologist
Frants Nielsen (1874–1961), Danish Olympic sports shooter

See also
Fran (disambiguation)
Frant
Frantz (disambiguation)

Danish masculine given names
Norwegian masculine given names